Botryodiplodia ulmicola is an ascomycete fungus that is a plant pathogen.

References

Fungal plant pathogens and diseases
Diaporthales
Fungi described in 1891